Sandy Stevens Tickodri-Togboa (born 29 October 1949) is a scientist, engineer, academic, and politician in Uganda. From 2015 to 2016, he served as the State Minister for Higher Education and Technology in the Cabinet of Uganda. He was appointed to that position on 1 March 2015, replacing John Chrysostom Muyingo; in the reshuffle of June 2016, however, he was not reappointed. As a cabinet minister, he was also an ex officio member of parliament. Before his ministerial appointment, he was a deputy vice chancellor at Makerere University, the oldest and largest of the eight public universities in Uganda.

Background and education
His mother died when he was three years old. His father, a construction worker, remarried after Togboa's mother died. Tickodri-Togboa attended Arua Junior School for his middle school studies He attended Nyakasura School before joining Nairobi University, where he studied electrical engineering. Later, he obtained a Master of Science from Makerere University and a doctorate from the University of Odessa in Ukraine.

Research activities and accomplishments

Academic records management systems
The Academic Records Management Systems (ARMS) Project aims at the development of a comprehensive user-centric ARMS to support Makerere University's logical and physical academic infrastructure, using state-of-the-art technologies and current generation industrial aesthetics. A home-born-and-grown project, it incorporates the provision of relevant learning experiences for students in the Faculty of Technology offers experiential learning (Equal Opportunities for Girl and Boy Child) and adds Value to the pedagogical experience. The ARMS project team is composed of thirteen undergraduate students (five females and eight males), and one junior member of staff. The System is currently being piloted in the Faculty of Technology and will eliminate the current challenges of inaccurate and delayed transcripts.

Electronic academic-events scheduling system

The Electronic Academic-Events Scheduling System (eAESS) Project is aimed at the development of an eAESS - state-of-the-art, needs-responsive, scheduling system using the Faculty of Technology as the development and test site. The eAESS is envisaged to go a long way in addressing the current challenges in scheduling and to build a robust timetabling system. The system will consist of three major sub-systems, namely; the Online Scheduling System, the Information Display System and the Uninterrupted Power Sub-System. The Online Scheduling System will enable lecturers to book time-slots and be allocated rooms subject to class size and other necessary academic resources. The Information Display System will be used to flaunt compiled schedules, notices and other communications from the administration. The Uninterrupted Power Sub-System will ensure round-the-clock availability. The Project Team includes three undergraduate students (two males and one female) and one junior member of staff.

iLABS

This project is being undertaken in collaboration with Massachusetts Institute of Technology in the United States, with the goal of developing on-line laboratories (iLABS) to supplement conventional laboratories to meet challenges of scarce financial resources and large student populations. The project engages undergraduate and graduate students and staff members in research geared towards development of online experiments. iLabs offer a flexible and convenient experimentation platform to an unlimited number of users; thus, alleviating space and scheduling problems associated with increasing student numbers. The current core development team is composed of eighteen undergraduate students (nine male and nine female), two undergraduate students, and three junior staff members. The project has so far developed over twelve iLabs and, working closely with the Electrical Engineering Department, these labs have been integrated into the B.Sc.Electrical Engineering and B.Sc.Telecommunication Engineering Programs to provide experimentation experience to students. Soon these will be incorporated in the B.Sc.Computer Engineering Program.

Vehicle design
The Makerere Vehicle Design Project, Center for Research in Transportation Technologies (CRTT), is one of the main innovative projects at the Faculty of Technology, Makerere University. Its main goal is to build and later bring to market an energy efficient electric vehicle with Makerere University campus as a test site. The project team comprises six undergraduate students (four male and two female) and three junior members of staff.

See also
Government of Uganda
Kiira Motors Corporation

References

External links
 Website of the Parliament of Uganda
 Kampala Journal; In Uganda, a Light of Learning Dims
 About iLABS

Living people
1949 births
Government ministers of Uganda
Ugandan electrical engineers
Members of the Parliament of Uganda
National Resistance Movement politicians
Academic staff of Makerere University
People from West Nile sub-region
People from Northern Region, Uganda